Right ascension (abbreviated RA; symbol ) is the angular distance of a particular point measured eastward along the celestial equator from the Sun at the March equinox to the (hour circle of the) point in question above the earth.<ref
></ref> 
When paired with declination, these astronomical coordinates specify the location of a point on the celestial sphere in the equatorial coordinate system.

An old term, right ascension<ref
>, "Ascensio recta Solis, stellæ, aut alterius cujusdam signi, est gradus æquatorus cum quo simul exoritur in sphæra recta"; roughly translated, "Right ascension of the Sun, stars, or any other sign, is the degree of the equator that rises together in a right sphere"</ref> refers to the ascension, or the point on the celestial equator that rises with any celestial object as seen from Earth's equator, where the celestial equator intersects the horizon at a right angle. It contrasts with oblique ascension, the point on the celestial equator that rises with any celestial object as seen from most latitudes on Earth, where the celestial equator intersects the horizon at an oblique angle.<ref
></ref>

Explanation

Right ascension is the celestial equivalent of terrestrial longitude. Both right ascension and longitude measure an angle from a primary direction (a zero point) on an equator. Right ascension is measured from the Sun at the March equinox i.e. the First Point of Aries, which is the place on the celestial sphere where the Sun crosses the celestial equator from south to north at the March equinox and is currently located in the constellation Pisces. Right ascension is measured continuously in a full circle from that alignment of Earth and Sun in space, that equinox, the measurement increasing towards the east.<ref
></ref>

As seen from Earth (except at the poles), objects noted to have 12 are longest visible (appear throughout the night) at the March equinox; those with 0 (apart from the sun) do so at the September equinox. On those dates at midnight, such objects will reach ("culminate" at) their highest point (their meridian). How high depends on their declination; if 0° declination (i.e. on the celestial equator) then at Earth's equator they are directly overhead (at zenith).

Any units of angular measure could have been chosen for right ascension, but it is customarily measured in hours (h), minutes (m), and seconds (s), with 24h being equivalent to a full circle. Astronomers have chosen this unit to measure right ascension because they measure a star's location by timing its passage through the highest point in the sky as the Earth rotates. The line which passes through the highest point in the sky, called the meridian, is the projection of a longitude line onto the celestial sphere.

Because right ascensions are measured in hours (of rotation of the Earth), they can be used
to time the positions of objects in the sky. For example, if a star with RA =  is at its meridian, then a star with RA =  will be on the/at its meridian (at its apparent highest point) 18.5 sidereal hours later.

Sidereal hour angle, used in celestial navigation, is similar to right ascension but increases westward rather than eastward. Usually measured in degrees (°), it is the complement of right ascension with respect to 24h. It is important not to confuse sidereal hour angle with the astronomical concept of hour angle, which measures the angular distance of an object westward from the local meridian.

Symbols and abbreviations

Effects of precession 

The Earth's axis traces a small circle (relative to its celestial equator) slowly westward about the celestial poles, completing one cycle in about 26,000 years.  This movement, known as precession, causes the coordinates of stationary celestial objects to change continuously, if rather slowly.  Therefore, equatorial coordinates (including right ascension) are inherently relative to the year of their observation, and astronomers specify them with reference to a particular year, known as an epoch. Coordinates from different epochs must be mathematically rotated to match each other, or to match a standard epoch. Right ascension for "fixed stars" on the equator increases by about 3.1 seconds per year or 5.1 minutes per century, but for fixed stars away from the equator the rate of change can be anything from negative infinity to positive infinity. (To this must be added the proper motion of a star.) Over a precession cycle of 26,000 years, "fixed stars" that are far from the ecliptic poles increase in right ascension by 24h, or about 5.6' per century, whereas stars within 23.5° of an ecliptic pole undergo a net change of0h. The right ascension of Polaris is increasing quicklyin AD 2000 it was 2.5h, but when it gets closest to the north celestial pole in 2100 its right ascension will be 6h. The North Ecliptic Pole in Draco and the South Ecliptic Pole in Dorado are always at right ascension 18h and 6h respectively.

The currently used standard epoch is J2000.0, which is January 1, 2000 at 12:00 TT. The prefix "J" indicates that it is a Julian epoch. Prior to J2000.0, astronomers used the successive Besselian epochs B1875.0, B1900.0, and B1950.0.

History

The concept of right ascension has been known at least as far back as Hipparchus who measured stars in equatorial coordinates in the 2nd century BC. But Hipparchus and his successors made their star catalogs in ecliptic coordinates, and the use of RA was limited to special cases.

With the invention of the telescope, it became possible for astronomers to observe celestial objects in greater detail, provided that the telescope could be kept pointed at the object for a period of time. The easiest way to do that is to use an equatorial mount, which allows the telescope to be aligned with one of its two pivots parallel to the Earth's axis. A motorized clock drive often is used with an equatorial mount to cancel out the Earth's rotation. As the equatorial mount became widely adopted for observation, the equatorial coordinate system, which includes right ascension, was adopted at the same time for simplicity. Equatorial mounts could then be accurately pointed at objects with known right ascension and declination by the use of setting circles. The first star catalog to use right ascension and declination was John Flamsteed's Historia Coelestis Britannica (1712, 1725).

See also

Notes and references

External links 
 MEASURING THE SKY A Quick Guide to the Celestial Sphere James B. Kaler, University of Illinois
 Celestial Equatorial Coordinate System University of Nebraska-Lincoln
 Celestial Equatorial Coordinate Explorers University of Nebraska-Lincoln
 
 Sidereal pointer (Torquetum) – to determine RA/DEC.

Astronomical coordinate systems
Angle
Technical factors of Western astrology